List of composers of Carnatic and Hindustani music, a subgenres of Indian classical music, who has created ragas. Composers are listed here based on the genres provided to the extent available.

References 

Ragas
Carnatic music
Lists of composers
India music-related lists
Indian classical music
Hindustani music